Stefan Böger (born 1 June 1966) is a German former professional football player and a coach who last managed Hallescher FC.

He played 239 top flight matches in Germany – 110 in the Oberliga in the GDR and 129 in the Bundesliga after German reunification. He won four caps for East Germany in the final year of its existence.

Honours
FDGB-Pokal runner-up: 1988

References

External links
 
 
 

Living people
1966 births
Sportspeople from Erfurt
German footballers
East German footballers
Footballers from Thuringia
Association football midfielders
East Germany international footballers
DDR-Oberliga players
Bundesliga players
2. Bundesliga players
3. Liga managers
FC Carl Zeiss Jena players
FC Hansa Rostock players
MSV Duisburg players
SC Fortuna Köln players
FC Gütersloh 2000 players
Hamburger SV players
Hamburger SV II players
German football managers
VfB Lübeck managers
Holstein Kiel managers
Dynamo Dresden managers
Hallescher FC managers
Guangzhou F.C. non-playing staff